Feugarolles is a commune in the Lot-et-Garonne department in south-western France.

Notable people
Feugarolles was the birthplace of:
 Adèle de Batz de Trenquelléon (1789-1828), foundress of the Daughters of Mary Immaculate, in 1816, in Agen

See also
Communes of the Lot-et-Garonne department

References

Communes of Lot-et-Garonne